Archibald F. Cameron (16 October 1919 – 12 January 1987) was a Canadian sailor who competed in the 1956 Summer Olympics. He was born in Montreal and died in Lancaster, Ontario.

References

1919 births
1987 deaths
Sportspeople from Montreal
Canadian male sailors (sport)
Olympic sailors of Canada
Sailors at the 1956 Summer Olympics – 12 m2 Sharpie